Forward Operating Base Delhi massacre are murders that occurred on August 10, 2012 at the Forward Operating Base Delhi within Garmsir village, Helmand Province, Afghanistan.  A young man, who had been allowed to live on the base, killed three unarmed U.S. Marines; one Marine was also severely injured.

Incident
The local police chief's tea boy (victim of the Afghan practise of bacha bazi) Aynoddin, stole an AK-47 from an unlocked barracks.  Aynoddin entered the gym and fired from the AK-47 at eight marines until he was out of ammunition. As Aynoddin left the gym he stated to Afghan police officers  "I just did jihad.  Don't you want to do jihad, too? If not, I will kill you."  Aynoddin was not arrested after the Afghan Police disarmed him.

Investigation
Aynoddin was identified as the gunman by the other Afghan police officers present and the Taliban took responsibility.  Naval Criminal Investigative Service has been conducting an investigation since the incident occurred.  The United States Attorney's Office in New York is currently investigating NCIS' case.  United States Congressman from New York Peter King has written letters to NCIS' director Mark Clookie and the USMC Commandant Gen. James F. Amos asking the status of the investigation.

References

See also 

 List of massacres in Afghanistan

2012 murders in Afghanistan
Mass shootings in Afghanistan
Massacres in Afghanistan
Terrorist incidents in Afghanistan in 2012
History of Helmand Province
Deaths by firearm in Afghanistan
2012 murders in Asia
Spree shootings in Afghanistan
United States Marine Corps in the War in Afghanistan (2001–2021)
August 2012 events in Afghanistan
Massacres in 2012